Florence Lee (March 12, 1888 – September 1, 1962) was an American actress of the silent era, who appeared in 22 films between 1921 and 1929. She was married to Canadian-American actor, director, and writer Dell Henderson and played in many films that he directed. 

Florence Lee was born in Jamaica, Vermont and died in Hollywood, California at the age of 74.

Partial filmography

 Seeing is Believing (1921)
 Custard's Last Stand (1921)
 Tee Time (1921)
 The Way of a Man (1924)

References

External links

1888 births
1962 deaths
American film actresses
American silent film actresses
Actresses from Vermont
People from Jamaica, Vermont
20th-century American actresses